Ryszard Fandier (11 June 1941 – 30 August 1980) was a Polish sports shooter. He competed in two events at the 1968 Summer Olympics.

References

1941 births
1980 deaths
Polish male sport shooters
Olympic shooters of Poland
Shooters at the 1968 Summer Olympics
Sportspeople from Łódź
20th-century Polish people